Thomas John Wyss (born October 24, 1942) is a former Republican member of the Indiana State Senate, representing the 15th district from 1985 until his retirement in 2014. He is Roman Catholic. He previously served on the Allen County Council from 1976 to 1985 and in the Indiana Air National Guard from 1966 to 1997.

References

External links
State Senator Thomas Wyss official Indiana State Legislature site
 
Thomas Wyss at Ballotpedia

1942 births
Indiana state senators
Living people
American Roman Catholics